The 2017–18 UNLV Runnin' Rebels basketball team represented the University of Nevada, Las Vegas during the 2017–18 NCAA Division I men's basketball season. The Runnin' Rebels were led by second-year head coach Marvin Menzies and played their home games at the Thomas & Mack Center in Paradise, Nevada as members of the Mountain West Conference. They finished the season 20–13, 8–10 in Mountain West play to finish in a tie for seventh place. They defeated Air Force in the first round of the Mountain West tournament before losing in the quarterfinals to Nevada. Despite having 20 wins, they did not participate in a postseason tournament after declining an invite to the CBI Tournament.

Previous season
The Runnin' Rebels finished the 2016–17 season 11–21, 4–14 in Mountain West play to finish in a tie for tenth place. They lost in the first round of the Mountain West tournament to San Diego State.

Offseason

Departures

Incoming transfers

2017 recruiting class

2018 recruiting class

Preseason 
In a vote by conference media at the Mountain West media day, the Rebels were picked to finish in sixth place in the Mountain West. Freshman forward Brandon McCoy was named to the preseason Mountain West Freshman of the Year.

Roster

Schedule and results

|-
!colspan=9 style=| Exhibition

|-
!colspan=9 style=| Non-conference regular season

|-
!colspan=9 style=| Mountain West regular season

|-
!colspan=9 style=| Mountain West tournament

References

UNLV
UNLV Runnin' Rebels basketball seasons
Run
Run